Olle Petrusson (born 14 November 1943) is a Swedish biathlete. He won team bronze medals at the 1966 and at the 1967 Biathlon World Championships and at the 1968 Winter Olympics. At the 1972 Olympics his team finished fifth. He also competed at the 1972 Winter Olympics.

Domestically, Petrusson competed alongside his brother, Johan Petrusson.

References

1943 births
Living people
Swedish male biathletes
Olympic biathletes of Sweden
Biathletes at the 1968 Winter Olympics
Biathletes at the 1972 Winter Olympics
Olympic bronze medalists for Sweden
Olympic medalists in biathlon
Biathlon World Championships medalists
Medalists at the 1968 Winter Olympics
20th-century Swedish people